Loxostege munroealis is a moth in the family Crambidae. It was described by Patrice J.A. Leraut in 2005. It is found in North America, where it has been recorded from British Columbia.

References

Moths described in 2005
Pyraustinae